Mohamed Amroune (born 10 March 1989, in Algiers) is an Algerian football player. He currently plays for NA Hussein Dey in the Algerian Ligue Professionnelle 2.

Honours
 Won the World Military Cup once with the Algerian National Military Team in 2011

References

External links
 
 

1989 births
Living people
Algerian footballers
Algeria under-23 international footballers
MC Alger players
Algerian Ligue Professionnelle 1 players
Footballers from Algiers
Algeria youth international footballers
ASO Chlef players
NA Hussein Dey players
Association football forwards
21st-century Algerian people